Ward T. Russell is an American cinematographer and photographer.

He is best known for his collaborations with film director Tony Scott, he served as a chief lighting technician on Scott's films Top Gun, Beverly Hills Cop II, Revenge, and as a cinematographer on Days of Thunder and The Last Boy Scout, which Scott also directed. His other cinematography credits include Lawnmower Man 2: Beyond Cyberspace, The X-Files, Unstoppable and Cruel World.

He is a graduate of the University of Kansas and is married to film production coordinator Mary Cay Hollander.

Filmography

As cinematographer 
Days of Thunder (1990)
The Last Boy Scout (1991) 
Lawnmower Man 2: Beyond Cyberspace (1996) 
The X-Files (1998) 
Unstoppable (2004) 
Cruel World (2005)
Wildfire (TV series) (2005); 5 episodes
The Burden Carriers (short film) (2007)

Other credits 
Record City (1977) (best boy)
Our Winning Season (1978) (best boy)
The Electric Horseman (1979) (best boy; uncredited)
The Idolmaker (1980) (electric best boy)
Soggy Bottom, U.S.A. (1981) (best boy)
Independence Day (1983) (best boy)
Dreamscape (1984) (gaffer)
Frankenweenie (1984) (gaffer)
Mussolini: The Untold Story (TV miniseries) (1985) (gaffer)
Top Gun (1986) (chief lighting technician) 
Back to School (1986) (gaffer)
Beverly Hills Cop II (1987) (chief lighting technician) 
Revenge (1990) (chief lighting technician) 
Elvis Has Left the Building (2004) (camera operator)
Believe in Me (2006) (director of photography: landscape) 
Undead or Alive (2007) (director of photography: second unit)

References

External links

American cinematographers
American photographers
University of Kansas alumni
Living people
Place of birth missing (living people)
Year of birth missing (living people)